Players for the original Cleveland Force (1978–88) of the Major Soccer League:

Regular season statistics only

A
 Luis Alberto, M (1980–82) 47 games, 20 goals, 31 assists
 Craig Allen, F (1982–88) 254 games, 275 goals, 180 assists
 Gary Allison, G (1979–80) 25 games, 4-10 record, 1 assist, 6.34 GAA
 Ian Anderson, D (1980–82) 48 games, 34 goals, 36 assists
 Desmond Armstrong, D (1986–88) 93 games, 14 goals, 26 assists
 Ruben Astigarraga, F (1979–82) 41 games, 39 goals, 41 assists
 Mohammad Attiah, F (1978–81) 37 games, 14 goals, 13 assists

B
 Mike Barca, G (1978–79) 10 games, 3-4 record, 4.77 GAA
 Mike Barry, M (1979–82) 68 games, 33 goals, 30 assists
 Chris Bennett, F (1979–80) 25 games, 6 goals, 6 assists
 Clyde Best, F (1979–80) 30 games, 33 goals, 16 assists
 Brian Bliss, D (1987–88) 51 games, 4 goals, 4 assists
 Rich Brands, G (1978–79) 13 games, 1-8 record, 7.99 GAA
 John Brooks, D (1979–80) 9 games, 1 goal, 0 assists
 Cliff Brown, G (1979–81) 61 games, 24-24 record, 2 assists, 5.17 GAA
 Brian Budd, F (1978–79) 19 games, 25 goals, 4 assists

C
 Marine Cano, G (1980–81) 18 games, 5-4 record, 4.92 GAA
 Peter Carr, D (1981–82) 14 games, 1 goal, 0 assists
 Caesar Cervin, F (1978–79) 19 games, 8 goals, 10 assists
 Andy Chapman, F (1984–86) 59 games, 34 goals, 25 assists
 Fadi Choujaa, F (1982-1982) 2 games, 0 goals, 1 assists
 Chris Chueden, M (1985–87) 44 games, 24 goals, 12 assists
 Lou Cioffi, G (1981–83) 17 games, 4-10 record, 1 goal, 5.50 GAA
 Prosper Cohen, M-F (1980–82) 60 games, 30 goals, 24 assists
 Tom Condric, F (1981–82) 38 games, 3 goals, 7 assists
 Charlie Cooke, F (1981–82) 19 games, 4 goals, 0 assists
 Brooks Cryder, D (1979–80) 32 games, 6 goals, 3 assists
 Everald Cummings, F (1978–79) 6 games, 1 goal, 0 assists

D
 Benny Dargle, D (1983–88) 247 games, 38 goals, 40 assists
 Vic Davidson, F (1982–84) 100 games, 79 goals, 56 assists
 Trevor Dawkins, D (1980–84) 168 games, 16 goals, 23 assists
 Pasquale de Luca, D (1985–88) 110 games, 19 goals, 23 assists
 Carlos DeVenutto, F (1979–80) 1 game, 0 goals, 1 assist
 George Dewsnip, F (1980–82) 54 games, 18 goals, 26 assists
 Kyle Dietrich, G (1983–85) 5 games, 4-1 record, 4.71 GAA
 Gino DiFlorio, F (1984–88) 128 games, 56 goals, 47 assists
 Tony Douglas (1978–79) 4 games, 0 goals, 1 assist
 Paul Dueker, G (1978–79) 1 game, 0-1 record, 14.00 GAA

E
 Mike England, D (1979–80) 11 games, 0 goals, 1 assist
 Gino Epifani, G (1987–88) 2 games, 0-0 record, 27.27 GAA
 Pat Ercoli, F (1985–86) 29 games, 6 goals, 4 assists
 Bobby Joe Esposito, F (1987–88) 37 games, 10 goals, 4 assists
 Gary Evans, M (1979–80) 8 games, 0 goals, 2 assists

F
 Gordon Fearnley, F (1978–79) 4 games, 1 goal, 2 assists
 Drew Ferguson, D (1983–84) 44 games, 20 goals, 13 assists
 George Fernandez, D (1983–85) 6 games, 0 goals, 1 assist
 Ivair Ferreira, F (1980–81) 29 games, 16 goals, 4 assists
 Pat Fidelia, F (1979–80) 29 games, 10 goals, 9 assists
 Trevor Franklin, D (1981–82) 26 games, 2 goals, 6 assists
 Keith Furphy, F (1981–85) 188 games, 185 goals, 105 assists
 Graham Fyfe, F (1980–81) 33 games, 38 goals, 20 assists

G
 Randy Garber, D (1978–79) 1 games, 0 goals, 0 assists
 Freddie Garcia (1978–79) 6 games, 3 goals, 3 assists 
 Poli Garcia, F (1979–80) 29 games, 21 goals, 15 assists
 Tony Graham, F (1980–81) 19 games, 1 goal, 0 assists
 Charlie Greene, M (1982–84) 41 games, 15 goals, 18 assists
 Dave Grimaldi, D (1979–82) 110 games, 5 goals, 11 assists

H
 Kai Haaskivi, F-M (1982–88) 241 games, 159 goals, 243 assists
 Bret Hall, D (1983–85) 62 games, 2 goals, 8 assists
 Alan Hamlyn, D (1978–79) 23 games, 6 goals, 5 assists
 John Houska, G (1980–82) 36 games, 10-19 record, 5.44 GAA
 Bob Hritz, F (1978–79) 10 games, 2 goals, 1 assist
 Alan Hudson, F (1979–80) 13 games, 6 goals, 13 assists
 Jimmy Husband, M-F (1981–82) 33 games, 9 goals, 6 assists

I
 Josef Ilic, F (1982–83) 28 games, 9 goals, 10 assists
 Radmilo Ivancevic, G (1982–83) 17 games, 8-6 record, 2 assists, 5.11 GAA

J
 Bernie James, D (1982–87) 226 games, 19 goals, 36 assists
 Wayne Jentas, D (1980–81) 38 games, 4 goals, 7 assists
 P.J. Johns, G (1984–88) 86 games, 45-35 record, 1 goal, 13 assists, 3.97 GAA  
 Scott Jones, D (1978–80) 10 games, 8 goals, 1 assist

K
 Michel Kaham, D (1982–85) 74 games, 3 goals, 7 assists
 Ali Kazemaini, M (1984–88) 144 games, 74 goals, 47 assists
 Michael King, F (1986–88) 70 games, 21 goals, 6 assists
 Paul Kitson, F (1986–88) 23 games, 6 goals, 3 assists
 Tommy Praefke Kristiansen, M (1983–85) 35 games, 9 goals, 5 assists

L
 Miodrag Lacevic, F (1980–81) 28 games, 3 goals, 4 assists
 Simon Look, F (1980–82) 65 games, 44 goals, 21 assists 
 Flemming Lund, M (1983–84) 11 games, 0 goals, 1 assist
 Glenn Lurie, F (1987–88) 8 games, 2 goals, 1 assist

M
 Danilo Mandic, D (1981–82) 9 games, 2 goals, 0 assists
 Hector Marinaro, D (1983–84) 5 games, 0 goals, 1 assist
 Jim May, G (1978–79) 12 games, 1-6 record, 1 assist, 6.01 GAA
 James McDonald, D (1979–80) 3 games, 0 goals, 0 assists
 Rildo Menezes, D (1978–79) 16 games, 2 goals, 0 assists
 Dennis Mepham, M (1984–88) 173 games, 52 goals, 51 assists
 Gene Michalow, D (1978–79) 3 games, 0 goals, 0 assists
 Peter Millar, M-D (1983–85) 63 games, 15 goals, 15 assists
 Bruce Miller, M (1979–80) 9 games, 5 goals, 4 assists
 Charlie Morgan, D (1985–87) 37 games, 0 goals, 5 assists
 Tim Murphy, D (1978–79) 23 games, 1 goal, 6 assists

N
 George Nanchoff, F (1981–85) 110 games, 54 goals, 39 assists
 Louie Nanchoff, F (1982–85) 122 games, 90 goals, 79 assists
 John Nelson, F (1978–79) 12 games, 3 goals, 4 assists
 Steve Newman, F (1978–79) 7 games, 0 goals, 0 assists
 Slavko Njegus, G (1981–82) 6 games, 1-2 record, 6.90 GAA
 Victor Nogueira, G (1987–88) 20 games, 11-8 record, 2 assists, 3.69 GAA
 Steve Norris, D (1978–79) 17 games, 1 goal, 1 assist
 Peter Notaro, F (1979–80) 8 games, 4 goals, 1 assist
 Marian Nowacki, D (1981–82) 13 games, 0 goals, 4 assists

O
 John O'Hara, D (1980–81) 37 games, 1 goal, 16 assists
 Francis Okaroh, D (1987–88) 13 games, 0 goals, 0 assists
 Hugh O'Neill (1979–80) 15 games, 1 goal, 2 assists
 Ross Ongaro, F (1982–84) 27 games, 6 goals, 5 assists

P
 Jose Perna (1978–79) 9 games, 0 goals, 2 assists
 Les Peterson, D (1978–80) 48 games, 5 goals, 10 assists
 Oscar Pisano, D (1979–80) 16 games, 2 goals, 2 assists
 Ben Popoola, F (1979–80) 8 games, 5 goals, 4 assists

R
 Branko Radović, D (1982–83) 40 games, 2 goals, 3 assists
 Joe Raduka, D (1983–87) 105 games, 6 goals, 11 assists
 Ricardo Rodrigues, F (1982–83) 34 games, 7 goals, 7 assists
 Ulf Ryberg, M (1985–86) 8 games, 1 goal, 1 assist

S
 Walter Schlothauer, D (1980–81) 28 games, 6 goals, 6 assists
 Andy Schmetzer, M (1986–88) 60 games, 21 goals, 13 assists
 Walt Schmetzer, M (1986–88) 36 games, 3 goals, 3 assists
 Ray Schnettgoecke, D (1979–80) 29 games, 4 goals, 5 assists
 Derek Scott, F (1981–82) 15 games, 2 goals, 0 assists
 Seninho, F (1987–88) 24 games, 6 goals, 1 assist
 Roy Sinclair, D (1978–81) 62 games, 22 goals, 29 assists
 Krys Sobieski, G (1983–85) 49 games, 26-16 record, 4 assists, 4.47 GAA
 Blaz Stimac, M (1978–79) 17 games, 8 goals, 6 assists
 John Stollmeyer, D (1986–88) 101 games, 29 goals, 21 assists
 David Stride, D (1981–82) 14 games, 0 goals, 4 assists
 Tony Suarez, F (1981–83) 9 games, 4 goals, 2 assists
 Mike Sweeney, M (1984–87) 87 games, 18 goals, 36 assists

T
 Alex Tarnoczi, M (1983–86) 83 games, 24 goals, 17 assists
 Kevin Terry, F (1979–82) 85 games, 12 goals, 4 assists

U
 Roman Urbanczuk, F (1978–79) 2 games, 0 goals, 0 assists

V
 Cris Vaccaro, G (1982–87) 149 games, 89-51 record, 2 goals, 24 assists, 4.57 GAA
 Carl Valentine, M (1985–88) 124 games, 83 goals, 66 assists
 John Victor, D (1980–84) 121 games, 28 goals, 29 assists
 Gary Vogel, D (1982–83) 17 games, 2 goals, 2 assists

W
 Peter Ward, F (1984–87) 133 games, 89 goals, 58 assists
 Ron Wigg, F (1979–80) 10 games, 5 goals, 3 assists
 Dieter Wimmer, F (1980–81) 7 games, 0 goals, 0 assists

Y
 Mark Yeeles, M (1978–79) 17 games, 3 goals, 1 assist

Z
 Elias Zurita, F (1987–88) 26 games, 3 goals, 1 assist

 
Force
Cleveland Force
Association football player non-biographical articles
Cleveland Force (1978–1988) players